"The Next Time" is an 1895 short story by Henry James.

Plot summary
Mrs Highmore asks the narrator to look through a book by Ralph Limbert which she deems artistic. The author works as a journalist for The Blackport Beacon to support his family. His attempts at writing trashy/journalistic pieces is to not avail, and he gets dismissed from his job for it. He is writing another novel entitled The Major Key - although it is said to be a good book it won't sell much, not enough for him to get married on. He goes on to publish other books without commercial success.

He subsequently takes up work for another newspaper which sets out to let him be more artistic. The narrator comes across a good review on his latest book from an American newspaper. Yet, as Mrs Highmore tells the narrator, Ralph gets dismissed again after having an argument with his editor over his elitist writings, the narrator's nagging advice, and comedian Minnie Meadows. The narrator reflects that Limbert is not capable of appealing to the masses.

Ralph then moves to the countryside, poor and humiliated as he is. He writes The Hidden Heart, which again is no success. Unable to afford to spend the winter in Egypt as he should on doctor's order, he writes another novel, Derogation, instead, and passes away before getting it published.

Characters
the narrator
Mrs Highmore
Mr Cecil Highmore, Mrs Highmore's husband
Ralph Limbert, a writer
Mrs Stannace
Pat Moyle, another writer
Lady Robeck
Mr Bousefield, a magazine editor

References to other works
William Shakespeare's King Lear is mentioned to describe Mrs Stannace.
Mrs Limbert mentions William Shakespeare and Walter Scott.

Publication history
"The Next Time" first appeared in The Yellow Book, issue #6, in July 1895.

Its hardcover debut, in a volume titled Embarrassments, came in June 1896 from London publisher William Heinemann and the Macmillan Company in New York. Three other stories appear in the book: "The Figure in the Carpet", "Glasses",  and "The Way It Came".

External links

Full text

Short stories by Henry James
1895 short stories